Komelon Co. Ltd. (hangul:코멜론주식회사) is a Korean chemical, machinery, tool and engineering company, headquartered in Busan, Korea.  Established in 1963, it  manufactures plastic and steel tape measures, level gauges and other tool products. The "Komelon" CEO is D.K. Kong and Bak Gi Seok (박기석). The company is commonly referred to as "Komelon" (Spelling Korea Motorized Electron).

Komelon manufactures the Kobalt brand of tape measures for US-based home improvement chain Lowe's.

Products
Stainless Steel Tapes
Power Tapes
Fiberglass
Long Steel
Magnetic Tapes
Other Products - Levels, Measuring Wheels

See also
Economy of South Korea
Engineering
Chemical
Machinery

Official Homepages
Komelon Homepage
Komelon Kosdaq Investment Homepage
Komelon USA Homepage

References

Engineering companies of South Korea
Chemical companies of South Korea
Manufacturing companies based in Busan
Manufacturing companies established in 1963
Garden tool manufacturers
South Korean brands
Companies listed on the Korea Exchange